Aurotioprol is a gold salt used as an antirheumatic agent.

References 

Gold(I) compounds
Antirheumatic products
Metal-containing drugs